Podosesia is a genus of moths in the family Sesiidae.

Species
Podosesia aureocincta Purrington & Nielsen, 1977
Podosesia syringae (Harris, 1839)
Podosesia surodes Hampson, 1919

References

Sesiidae